Serhan is a masculine Turkish given name with Persian origin derived from Persian words ser "head, top" and han, which is from the title khan meaning "leader". Notable people with the name include:

 Serhan Poçan, Turkish mountaineer
 Serhan Yavaş, Turkish actor and model

Turkish masculine given names